Playwin is an online lottery run by the Essel Group through PAN India and sanctioned by the Sikkim government. It was one of the first such lotteries to be opened in India. Established in November 2001, it had sales throughout India both through retailers and online. It quickly became known as one of the most popular lotteries in India.

The Playwin lottery is temporarily paused as the Essel Group had to sell of parts of their operations to cover debts.

The biggest Playwin jackpot was from the Thursday Super Lotto game, amounting more than Rs.17crore rupees, and won by a resident of Kolkata Mr Jay Prakash Jaiswal. In 2006, Mid-Day reported  that there was no taker for a winning jackpot ticket in Pune with prize money of Rs 2 Crores. In August 2015, Playwin felicitated and handed over cheques worth over Rs 9 Crores to its jackpot winners at a grand ceremony held at hotel The Lalit in Santa Cruz, Mumbai.

Playwin can also be played with a card. These cards are sold in denominations of 200 rupees, 500 rupees, 1000 rupees and 5000 rupees.

In addition, Playwin previously had operations in the Indian states of Karnataka and Maharashtra.

Games
Throughout the years the Playwin lottery offered a total of 13 different games. Games prior to 2010 included Friday Easy Lotto, Lucky 3, Max 3, Keno,  Triple Ticket, E-Play, Joker and Joker 5.

When Playwin stopped operations it offered five lotto games:

Jaldi 5 - Draw every Friday between 22:00 and 22:30.
Jaldi 5 Double + - Draw every Wednesday between 21:30 and 22:00.
Thunderball Draw every Tuesday between 22:00 and 22:30.
Thursday Super Lotto Draw every Thursday between 22:00 and 22:30.
Saturday Super Lotto Draw every Saturday between 22:00 and 22:30.

Super Lotto Prize Structure
The table below shows the prizes and odds of winning for both Thursday and Saturday Super Lotto draws.

Insolvency
On the 14th October 2019 Pan India Network limited had an order for the commencement of Corporate Insolvency resolution Process ordered against it by the National Company Law Tribunal in India. Pan India Network limited was asked to submit all necessary claims to the Interim Resolution Professional and shut down its lottery draws. The final playwin draw that took place was the Jaldi 5 Double draw on 1 October 2019.

References

External links
Official Website

Lottery games
Sikkim
Companies based in Sikkim
Gambling in India
Essel Group
2001 establishments in India